The Portugal Masters was a European Tour men's professional golf tournament which was played for the first time in October 2007. It had a prize fund is US$2 million, making it one of the richest golf tournaments in Portugal. It was jointly staged by the European Tour and the Portuguese Tourist Board (ITP).  The host course is the Arnold Palmer designed Dom Pedro Victoria Golf Course in Vilamoura.

Winners

Notes

References

External links
Coverage on the European Tour's official site
Additional information about this golfing event

Former European Tour events
Golf tournaments in Portugal
Sport in Algarve
Recurring sporting events established in 2007
2007 establishments in Portugal
Autumn events in Portugal